Clinidium granatense is a species of ground beetle in the subfamily Rhysodinae. It was described by Louis Alexandre Auguste Chevrolat in 1873. It is known from Colombia (Medellin, Bogota, and Boyacá).

Clinidium granatense measure  in length.

References

Clinidium
Beetles of South America
Arthropods of Colombia
Endemic fauna of Colombia
Beetles described in 1873
Taxa named by Louis Alexandre Auguste Chevrolat